Pepijn van den Nieuwendijk (Waddinxveen, October 13, 1970) is a Dutch painter and ceramist.

Life and work 
Van den Nieuwendijk graduated in 1995 as a graphic designer. After his studies he focused on illustrating and painting, until he came into contact  with ceramics in 2002.

In October 2007 he hit the headlines after he solved a major art theft via Google from Hague galleries. As he searched for his own name, he found his stolen works of art at an auction site. Besides the paintings of Pepin van den Nieuwendijk the police discovered the thief of more than a hundred paintings and sculptures by various artists.

See also  
 List of Dutch ceramists
 List of Dutch sculptors

References

External links 

 Official website

1970 births
Living people
Dutch ceramists
People from Waddinxveen